Huaxiang Dongqiao station is a station on the Fangshan line of the Beijing Subway.

History 
In August 2020, the Beijing Municipal Commission of Planning and Natural Resources proposed to rename the station to either Huaxiang Dongqiao or Huangtugang station. On 28 October 2020, the name Huaxiang Dongqiao was finally chosen for this station. The station opened on 31 December 2020.

Platform Layout
The station has an underground island platform.

Exits
There are 3 exits, lettered A1, A2 and B. Exit A2 is accessible via an elevator.

References 

Beijing Subway stations in Fengtai District